The War on Terror is the campaign launched by the United States of America in response to the September 11 attacks against organizations designated with terrorism. The campaign, whose stated objective was eliminating international terrorism, began in 2001. The following is a timeline of events linked to the War on Terror.

2001

2002

2003

2004

2005

2006

2007

2008

2009

2010

2011

2012

2013

2014

2015

2016

2017

2018

2019

2020

2021

2022

2023

See also 
 List of Islamist terrorist attacks

References

Further reading 
 
 
 

War on terror
War on Terror
War on Terror
United States military history timelines